The president of the Maryland Senate is elected by the State Senate. The incumbent is Bill Ferguson who has held the role since 2020.

The Maryland Constitution of 1864 created the new position of Lieutenant Governor of Maryland, elected by the voters of the state. That officer served as president of the Senate and would assume the office of governor if the incumbent should die, resign, be removed, or be disqualified. Christopher Christian Cox was the first and only lieutenant governor to preside over the Senate in that capacity; the position was abolished in the state's 1867 Constitution, which remains in effect as amended. When the lieutenant governorship was re-established by a constitutional amendment in 1970, it did not include the Senate presidency.

List of Senate presidents

* Cox was elected Lieutenant Governor under the 1864 Constitution, which made him ex officio president of the Senate.

References

List of Presidents of the State Senate from the Maryland Archives